Piotr Wojdyga (born 12 September 1962) is a former Polish footballer who played as a goalkeeper.

Biography

Playing career
Born in Warsaw, it is known that Wojdyga started his career with Okęcie Warszawa, based in Western Warsaw. While it is not known how long Wojdyga played for the Okęcie youth sides, but it is known that he played for the first team in 1982–83. After one season with Okęcie, Wojdyga joined I liga team Bałtyk Gdynia. In his first season with the club he was the third choice goalkeeper, failing to make an appearance for the first team. In his second season with Bałtyk Wojdyga made his top tier debut, and made 3 appearances in the league that season.

Wojdyga's career really took off when he joined Stal Mielec in 1985. He spent six seasons with Stal, 5 of those coming in Poland's top division and making a total of 134 I liga appearances for the club. Wojdyga became Stal's first choice goalkeeper during this time, and while it is not known how many games he played in the II liga after Stal were relegated in the 1986–87, it is known that Stal won the league and made an immediate return to the top division. 

In 1991 Wojdyga joined newly promoted Widzew Łódź, playing 34 games as Widzew went on to finish in an impressive 3rd place. The next two seasons were not as successful for Widzew or Wojdyga, but he went on to play 76 games for Widzew in the league. In January 1994 he joined Pelikan Łowicz, with whom he played for 6 months before joining Olimpia Poznań. He played 26 games for Olimpia before the team were involved in a merger with Lechia Gdańsk, creating the short lived Olimpia-Lechia Gdańsk team. The Olimpia-Lechia lasted only one season before it was dissolved, with Wojdyga becoming the teams main choice goalkeeper, making 22 appearances in the league that season. After the team were dissolved Wojdyga found himself a free agent, moving to join Polonia Warsaw instead of the Lechia Gdańsk team taking the place of Olimpia-Lechia. In his final 3 seasons as a professional he made 66 appearances for Polonia, spending his final season at the club as a reserve and not making any appearances that season, deciding to retire from professional football. In total during his career he made 327 appearances in Poland's top division.

Coaching career
After his playing career Wojdyga tried his hand with managerial positions, managing lower league clubs Ceramika Opoczno and Tłoki Gorzyce. At one point he was linked with the managerial job for Arka Gdynia, deciding instead to become the goalkeeping coach of Polonia Warsaw instead. After becoming a goalkeeping coach he has held this role at Korona Kielce, Górnik Zabrze, Odra Wodzisław, and again with Polonia Warsaw.

Honours

Stal Mielec
II liga: 1987–1988

References

1962 births
Okęcie Warsaw players
Bałtyk Gdynia players
Stal Mielec players
Widzew Łódź players
Pelikan Łowicz players
Olimpia Poznań players
Lechia Gdańsk players
Polonia Warsaw players
Polish footballers
Association football goalkeepers
Living people